Uriel Waizel (born September 18, 1973 in Mexico City) is a music critic and radio broadcaster.

See also 

List of Mexican Jews

References 

1973 births
Mexican radio presenters
People from Mexico City
Mexican Jews
Living people